Balboa is an island district (distrito) of Panamá Province in Panama, covering the offshore Pearl Islands lying in the Gulf of Panama southeast of Panama City. The population according to the 2000 census was 2,336; the latest official estimate (for 2019) is 3,332. The district covers a total area of 333 km². The capital lies at the town of San Miguel.

Administrative divisions
Balboa District is divided administratively into the following corregimientos:

San Miguel (capital)
La Ensenada
La Esmeralda
La Guinea
Pedro González
Saboga

References

Districts of Panamá Province